The 1856 United States presidential election in Rhode Island took place on November 4, 1856, as part of the 1856 United States presidential election. Voters chose four representatives, or electors to the Electoral College, who voted for president and vice president.

Rhode Island voted for the Republican candidate, John C. Frémont, over the Democratic candidate, James Buchanan, and the Know Nothing candidate, Millard Fillmore. Frémont won the state by a margin of 24.15%.

With 57.85% of the popular vote, Rhode Island proved to be Frémont's fourth strongest state in the 1856 election after Vermont, Massachusetts and Maine.

Results

See also
 United States presidential elections in Rhode Island

References

Rhode Island
1856
1856 Rhode Island elections